"Ne si za men" is a song performed by Bulgarian-Russian singer Kristian Kostov. The song was released in Bulgaria as a digital download single on 7 October 2016 through the Bulgarian label Virginia Records. On 13 January 2017, he released an English version of the song called "You Got Me Girl".

Music video
A music video to accompany the release of "Ne si za men" was first released onto YouTube on 7 October 2016 at a total length of four minutes and seventeen seconds. The music video for the English version was released onto YouTube on 13 January 2017.

Track listing

Release history

References

2016 songs
2016 singles